Joseph Dominic Hackett (born 4 August 1925) is an Irish former tennis player. He was also capped for Leinster in rugby union and captained Old Belvedere R.F.C.

Hackett, who made his first Irish Championship final aged 16, was active on the tennis circuit from the 1940s to the early 1960s. An Ireland Davis Cup player from 1950 to 1961, Hackett won four singles and four doubles rubbers, then later served the team as non playing captain. He was a regular participant at Wimbledon in the 1950s.

See also
List of Ireland Davis Cup team representatives

References

External links
 
 
 

1925 births
Possibly living people
Irish male tennis players
Irish rugby union players
Old Belvedere R.F.C. players
Leinster Rugby players